Baku Expo Center (Baku Expo Exhibition and Convention Center) - is an international standard, purpose-built events venue. It is located in H.Aliyev ave., Surakhany district, Baku, Azerbaijan. It provides over 30,000m² of exhibition space and includes facilities for hosting conferences, meetings, seminars and presentations. It was opened on June 1, 2010 with "Caspian Oil and Gas 2010" exhibition. It is the second largest Expo center after Moscow Expo Center among the CIS countries.

Since opening, many exhibitions like "Caspian Oil & Gas 2010", "BakuBuild-2010", "Bakutel 2010", "AutoShow 2011" were provided in this venue.

Baku Expo Center is located on the territory with total area of 10 ha. There are three pavilions for large-scale events, a large lobby covering an area of 4,000 square meters and an exposition area of 20,000 square meters behind the lobby, as well as business center, food courts and other service rooms. Halls and meeting rooms are available for international conferences, different exhibitions, seminars, events, product demonstrations.  There is a parking space for over 500 cars in front of the complex. The Expo Centre is situated near the airport and it is 20 minutes from the city centre.

Exhibitions

17th International Caspian Oil & Gas Exhibition 

Opening of Baku Expo Center was realized with 17th International Caspian Oil & Gas Exhibition on June 1–4, 2010. The exhibition hosted 280 companies from 26 countries. The international companies such as Itochu, OMV Gas International GmbH, State Oil Company of Azerbaijan Republic (SOCAR), Statoil ASA, Total, TPAO covered over 40% of the exhibition space.

7th Azerbaijan International Automotive Exhibition 

In March 2011 the 7th Azerbaijan International Automotive Exhibition was held in Baku Expo Center for the first time. The exhibition was attended by 105 companies from 14 countries and regions such as Azerbaijan, Switzerland, Belarus, Denmark, Italy, Canada, China, Malaysia, Russia, Taiwan, Germany, Turkey and Japan. The exhibition included sectors such as cars, commercial transport, automotive parts and accessories for all types of transport.

8th Caspian International Protection, Security and Rescue Exhibition 
Baku Expo Center hosted the 8th Caspian International Protection, Security and Rescue Exhibition (CIPS Caspian) on 21–24 October 2015. At the exhibition US, Belarus, the United Kingdom, China, Russia, Turkey, Ukraine and other countries demonstrated their products.

Azinteco, Digital Solutions, Protect.az, Gozcu Guaranty, Southwest MW, Teko- Torgoviy Dom, Poliservice and others companies joined the exhibition. CIPS Caspian 2015 mainly exhibited security equipment, closed-type security television and surveillance systems, as well as smart-cards, emergency-rescue equipment, information security tools, ID-technologies, turnstiles and a number of other products.

Aquatherm 2017 

From October 18 to 21 the 10th Anniversary International Exhibition for Heating, Ventilation, Air- Conditioning, Water Supply, Sanitary, Environmental Technology, Swimming Pool and Renewable Energies was held in Baku.

Baku Expo Center welcomed exhibitors from China, Azerbaijan, France, Italy, Iran, Kuwait, Turkey, etc. International Companies such as Euroclima, Yusiko, BestTechniK, Azertexnolayn, Alarko Carrier Sanayi ve Ticaret, Egeplast Ege Plastik, Turan Makinе, Termo ISI, Polimart, Ultratek, Sumgait Technologies Park, Kaskad – Hidro, Yetsan Pazarlama Isi Sistemleri participated at the exhibition.

International Real Estate and Investment Fair (RecExpo) 
An International Real Estate and Investment Fair (RecExpo) which was organized by the State Committee on Property Issues, and the companies of Atılım Fuarcılık and Elan Expo was held on 28–30 November 2017. Baku Expo Center hosted the exhibition.

The presentation ceremony is 5600 square meters. 70 companies from 14 countries such as Turkey, France, the UK, United Arab Emirates, Poland, Qatar, Georgia, as well as Azerbaijan  participated in the exhibition. The participants presented over 150 projects.

11th Azerbaijan International Education Exhibition 

On October 6–8 Baku Expo Center hosted 11th Azerbaijan International Education Exhibition where the universities, schools, colleges, training centres of different countries such as Austria, Belarus, Germany, Italy, Latvia, Lithuania, Russia, Singapore, Slovakia were presented.  Within the framework of the exhibition, visitors were presented with bachelors, masters and postgraduate programs, foreign language courses, internships and training sessions.

12th International Education Exhibition "Education 2018" 
Baku Expo Center also hosted the  "Education 2018" exhibition on October 1, 2018. The exhibition was sponsored by the Ministry of Education of Azerbaijan under the slogan "Investing in the future of children". 12 countries with totally 135 educational institutions participated in the exhibition.

The 12th Azerbaijan International Career Exhibition 2018 also started in parallel with the Education Exhibition. The main purpose of the exhibition was to arrange a meeting between employers and job seekers.

24th Azerbaijan International Construction Exhibition "BakuBuild Azerbaijan 2018” 
The 24th Azerbaijan International Construction Exhibition - BakuBuild Azerbaijan 2018 that co-organized by Iteca Caspian and Caspian Event was held at the Baku Expo Center on October 23–26, 2018.

The exhibition brought together professionals from this field on their platform and presented the latest innovations. The exhibition was sponsored by the Ministry of Economy of Azerbaijan, the State Committee for Urban Planning, as well as the Union of Architects of Azerbaijan, the National Confederation of Entrepreneurs and AZPROMO.

Over 250 companies from 20 countries such as  Canada, Finland, Azerbaijan, Ukraine, Denmark, Greece, China, Turkey, Russia, Slovenia, USA and other countries exhibited their products and projects in the exhibition. At the exhibition construction materials such as plastics, door and window parts, damp, etc. were demonstrated.

9th Azerbaijan International Environmental Exhibition Caspian Ecology 
Baku hosted the 9th Azerbaijan International Environmental Exhibition "Caspian Ecology" on November 10, 2018. The exhibition was held under the slogan "Change yourself, not nature!" at the Baku Expo Center. The exhibition was supported by  Ministry of Ecology and Natural Resources.

43 companies from different countries of the world participated in the exhibition. The use of plastic products, ecologically clear drinking water and food, water recycling and other ecological issues were reflected on the stands.

24th Azerbaijan International Telecommunications, Innovation and High Technologies Exhibition and Conference "Bakutel 2018" 
On 10 December 2018 “Bakutel 2018” -24th Azerbaijan International Telecommunications, Innovations and High Technologies Exhibition and Conference was held in Baku. 230 companies representing 20 countries took part in the exhibition at the Baku Expo Center.

Bakutel 2018 exhibited various internet products, technologies for bank system, mobile technologies, fiber-optic technologies, state services and electronic health technologies, etc.

See also 
 https://www.safelife.az/ru/index.php/layihlr/98-baku-expo-center.html
 https://www.cvent.com/venues/baku/exposition-center/baku-expo-center/venue-684fd9f3-0bfb-4fb4-af3e-9625bc11c684?aCode=DKND288S8SN

References

Buildings and structures in Baku
2010 establishments in Azerbaijan